If I Could is a song written by Pontus Assarsson, Jörgen Ringqvist, Lisa Troedsson-Lundin, Caisa Troedsson-Lundin, Anna Törnqvist och Malin Törnqvist. The song was originally performed during the fourth semifinal of Melodifestivalen 2008 in Karlskrona by Calaisa, but didn't make it further in the contest.

The song received a Svensktoppen test for two weeks in a row, but failed to enter chart.

The country pop song is about losing a loved person, and be ready to do anything to get him or her back.

Contributors
Pontus Assarsson - guitar, producer
Jörgen Ringqvist - guitar, drums, percussion, programming, producer
Roger Gustafsson - steelguitar

Charts

References

2008 singles
English-language Swedish songs
Melodifestivalen songs of 2008
2008 songs
Songs written by Pontus Assarsson
Songs written by Jörgen Ringqvist